An Yong-woo (Hanja:安庸佑; born 10 August 1991) is a South Korean footballer who last played as a forward for Daegu FC.

Club career

Jeonnam Dragons
He joined Jeonnam Dragons in 2014. He made his first appearance at the opening match of 2014 K League 1 against FC Seoul.

Sagan Tosu
In December 2020, An departed Sagan Tosu after four seasons.

Club statistics
Updated to 2 Oct 2021.

References

External links 
Profile at Sagan Tosu

An Yong-woo at Asian Games Incheon 2014

1991 births
Living people
Association football forwards
South Korean footballers
Jeonnam Dragons players
J1 League players
Sagan Tosu players
K League 1 players
Dankook University alumni
Footballers at the 2014 Asian Games
Asian Games medalists in football
Asian Games gold medalists for South Korea
Medalists at the 2014 Asian Games
Dong-Eui University alumni